The D-class trams were a class of single bogie Californian Combination type trams operated on the Sydney tram network with open cross benches at the ends and a saloon in the centre.

History
In 1896, Clyde Engineering delivered car 123 with an elliptical roof. The 24 others numbered 93-121 had a clerestory roof and were built by Clyde Engineering and Ritchie Brothers in 1899.

The composite design and terminology was adapted from a popular style of car tram operating in California. They were introduced to give more room for smokers who were previously confined to car entrances. They were four wheel cars, seating capacity being originally 32, later being increased to 34. The last was withdrawn in 1925. Some were converted to track scrubbers with one sold to Brisbane.

Preservation
Two have been preserved:
102 at the Sydney Tramway Museum, converted to track scrubber in 1930 and renumbered 134s, operational, was used as a track scrubber on the Wentworth Park light rail line in 1997
117 at the Sydney Tramway Museum, converted to breakdown car 112s in 1913 and is currently halfway through being returned to passenger configuration.

References

Further reading

External links

Trams in Sydney
Tram vehicles of Australia